A bind rune or bindrune is a Migration Period Germanic ligature of two or more runes. They are extremely rare in Viking Age inscriptions, but are common in earlier (Proto-Norse) and later (medieval) inscriptions.

On some runestones, bind runes may have been ornamental and used to highlight the name of the carver.

Description

There are two types of bind runes. Normal bind runes are formed of two (or rarely three) adjacent runes which are joined together to form a single conjoined glyph, usually sharing a common vertical stroke (see Hadda example below). Another type of bind rune called a same-stave rune, which is common in Scandinavian runic inscriptions but does not occur at all in Anglo-Saxon runic inscriptions, is formed by several runic letters written sequentially along a long common stemline (see þ=r=u=t=a=ʀ= =þ=i=a=k=n example shown above). In the latter cases the long bind rune stemline may be incorporated into an image on the rune stone, for example as a ship's mast on runestones Sö 158 at Ärsta and Sö 352 in Linga, Södermanland, Sweden, or as the waves under a ship on DR 220 in Sønder Kirkeby, Denmark.

Examples

Elder futhark
Examples found in Elder Futhark inscriptions include:
 Stacked Tiwaz runes: Kylver Stone, Seeland-II-C
 Gebô runes combined with vowels: Kragehul I
 The syllable ing written as a ligature of Isaz and Ingwaz (the so-called "lantern rune").

Anglo-Saxon Futhorc
Bind runes are not common in Anglo-Saxon inscriptions, but double ligatures do sometimes occur, and triple ligatures may rarely occur. The following are examples of bind-runes that have been identified in Anglo-Saxon runic inscriptions:

 The word  is written with a ligatured double  (dd) on the Thornhill III rune-stone
 The name  is written with a ligatured double  (dd) on the Derbyshire bone plate
This is the only known certain Anglo-Saxon triple bind rune. There is possibly a faint ,  (ed) bind rune on the reverse of the amulet.

Modern use
The two letters form the initials 'H B', alluding to the Danish king and viking raider Harald Bluetooth, for whom Bluetooth was named.
 The former logo of Thor Steinar featured a combination of a *tiwaz rune and a *sowilo rune .

Gallery

See also
 Cipher runes
 Pseudo-runes
 List of runestones

References

External links
 Nordic bind runes

Runology